Éric Yves Di Meco (born 7 September 1963) is a French former professional footballer who played as a left back.

Club career
Di Meco was born in Avignon, Vaucluse. During his career, he played mostly for Olympique de Marseille. After starting as a midfielder and serving loans at AS Nancy and FC Martigues, he returned definitely in 1988, going on to amass a further 153 Ligue 1 games in an eventual four-in-a-row run of domestic leagues.

After Marseille's relegation at the end of the 1993–94 season, due to irregularities, Di Meco joined AS Monaco  still appearing regularly until his 1998 retirement at almost 35 years of age, with another league title conquered.

International career
For France, Di Meco won the Kirin Cup in 1994 and was in roster for UEFA Euro 1996. After the latter competition, where he acted as backup to the younger Bixente Lizarazu, he retired from international football.

Post-retirement
After retiring from the pitches, Di Meco pursued a career as a politician, acting as municipal council for UMP in Marseille.

Honours
Marseille
Division 1: 1988–89, 1989–90, 1990–91, 1991–92
Coupe de France: 1988–89
UEFA Champions League/European Cup: 1992–93; runner-up: 1990–91

Monaco
Division 1: 1996–97

France
Kirin Cup: 1994

Orders
Knight of the National Order of Merit: 1996

References

External links

L'OM profile 
 
 

1963 births
Living people
Sportspeople from Avignon
French footballers
France international footballers
Association football defenders
Olympique de Marseille players
AS Nancy Lorraine players
FC Martigues players
AS Monaco FC players
Ligue 1 players
Ligue 2 players
UEFA Euro 1996 players
UEFA Champions League winning players
French politicians
French sportsperson-politicians
Knights of the Ordre national du Mérite
French people of Italian descent
Footballers from Provence-Alpes-Côte d'Azur